The Classical Groups: Their Invariants and Representations is a mathematics book by , which describes classical invariant theory in terms of representation theory. It is largely responsible for the revival of interest in invariant theory, which had been almost killed off by David Hilbert's solution of its main problems in the 1890s. 

 gave an informal talk about the topic of his book. There was a second edition in 1946.

Contents
Chapter I defines invariants and other basic ideas and describes the relation to Felix Klein's Erlangen program in geometry. 

Chapter II describes the invariants of the special and general linear group of a vector space V on the polynomials over a sum of copies of  V and its dual. It uses the Capelli identity to find an explicit set of generators for the invariants. 

Chapter III studies the group ring of a finite group and its decomposition into a sum of matrix algebras.

Chapter IV discusses Schur–Weyl duality between representations of the symmetric and general linear groups.

Chapters V and VI extend the discussion of invariants of the general linear group in chapter II to the orthogonal and symplectic groups, showing that the ring of invariants is generated by the obvious ones.

Chapter VII describes the Weyl character formula for the characters of representations of the classical groups.

Chapter VIII on invariant theory proves Hilbert's theorem that invariants of the special linear group are finitely generated.

Chapter IX and X give some supplements to the previous chapters.

References

Invariant theory
Representation theory
Mathematics books